, (literally "Humming of Bees and Rotation of the Earth") is a Japanese documentary directed by Hitomi Kamanaka and released in 2010. It is the third in Kamanaka's trilogy of films on the problems of nuclear power and radiation, preceded by Hibakusha at the End of the World (also known as Radiation: A Slow Death) and Rokkasho Rhapsody.

Content
The documentary covers the long struggle of the residents of Iwaijima island in the Inland Sea of Japan to prevent the construction of a nuclear power plant across the bay. It compares the situation to Sweden, where models of sustainable energy are being explored.

Production
Kamanaka began filming the documentary in 2008 and completed it in 2010. The 2011 Tōhoku earthquake took place right during the film's first Tokyo screening.

Reception
In a poll of critics at Kinema Junpo, Ashes to Honey was selected as the fifth best documentary of 2011.

See also
List of books about nuclear issues
List of films about nuclear issues
Rokkasho Rhapsody

References

External links
Official site (in English)

2010 films
2011 in the environment
Japanese documentary films
Environmental films
Anti-nuclear films
Documentary films about nuclear technology
2010s Japanese-language films
2010 documentary films
Nuclear power in Japan
2010s Japanese films